Duynefontein is a proposed site for new nuclear power station.  It is a coastal site next to and just north of Koeberg Nuclear Power Station.

The significance of this locale is that it has been identified as a possible future nuclear reactor site by South African electricity utility Eskom.

The environmental impact assessments of 2009 have been revised and updated and public participation meetings held in Atlantic Beach Golf Club, Melkbosstrand on 12 October 2015 and Kenilworth Community Presbyterian Church, Kenilworth on 13 October 2015.

It is also a landing point for the Meta 2Africa subsea cable.

See also
Duinefontein, archaeological sites
Nuclear energy in South Africa

References

 

South African nuclear sites
Economy of the Western Cape